The 1964–65 Iraq Central FA First Division was the 17th season of the Iraq Central FA League (the top division of football in Baghdad and its neighbouring cities from 1948 to 1973). Maslahat Naqil Al-Rukab won the league title for the third time. Prior to the season, Al-Firqa Al-Khamisa won promotion by beating Shortat Al-Najda 2–0 to claim the second division title.

Aliyat Al-Shorta player Shaker Ismail was the league's top scorer with seven goals. As champions and runners-up, Maslahat Naqil Al-Rukab and Aliyat Al-Shorta competed for the 1965 Iraq Central FA Perseverance Cup on 4 June at Al-Kashafa Stadium and Maslahat Naqil Al-Rukab won 1–0 after extra time with a goal by Qais Hameed to win the cup.

League table

Results

Top goalscorers

References

External links
 Iraqi Football Website

Iraq Central FA League seasons
Iraq
1964 in Iraqi sport
1965 in Iraqi sport